Liam Fox is a British actor, known for portraying the role of Dan Spencer in the ITV soap opera Emmerdale since 2011.

Career
Fox has appeared in Dinnerladies and Coronation Street. He joined the cast of Emmerdale in late 2011 as Dan Spencer, the estranged husband of Ali Spencer (Kelli Hollis). He was initially contracted for eight episodes, but he was later promoted to the main cast. Fox previously made guest appearances in the show as Les (1993) and PC Tyrell (2002–2003) and Officer Price (2004). For his portrayal of Dan, Fox received a nomination for Most Popular Newcomer at the 18th National Television Awards.

Personal life
Fox married actress Nicole Barber-Lane in 1999. They have two children together. In February 2015, they announced that they were to divorce. Fox married Joanna Hudson in 2020. Hudson and Fox had previously dated at university.

Fox is a fan of Manchester United.

Awards and nominations

References

External links
 

British male actors
Living people
1970 births